StreetGames is one of the UK's leading 'sport for development' charities. Through their work with a network of over 1,400 trusted local community organisations, StreetGames addresses some of the most pressing issues faced by young people growing up in underserved communities, including poor mental health, food poverty, crime and lack of employment opportunities. 

At the core of StreetGames' approach to transform young people’s lives is Doorstep Sport, an evidence-based delivery approach underpinned by the '5 rights': sport delivered at the right time, the right place, in the right style, by the right people and at the right price. Doorstep Sport offers fun, informal sport and physical activity opportunities delivered by trusted community organisations in low-income, underserved neighbourhoods. It provides an exciting and varied sports offer to young people, improving motivation and encouraging them to develop long-term sporting habits.

StreetGames is registered as a charity with the Charity Commission (registered charity number 1113542) and as a company limited by guarantee with the Registrar of Companies (registered company number 5384487).

Background

StreetGames was founded in 2007 by Jane Ashworth, who received an OBE from the Queen in 2011 for her services to the industry. The founding of the charity was inspired by the success of joint work conducted by The FA, Football Foundation and other agencies working within underserved communities.

Since that time, young people and projects across the UK have benefitted from StreetGames' Doorstep Sport programme. Additional successes have included the female-focused Us Girls programme, launched in 2011, and the Fit and Fed campaign, which tackles issues of holiday hunger, inactivity and isolation.

In 2022, StreetGames launched a new 10-year strategy which lays out a road map to expand Doorstep Sport provision throughout the country and grow opportunities for young people in underserved communities to participate in sport.

StreetGames was one of the seven charities nominated by Prince Harry and Meghan Markle to receive donations in lieu of wedding presents when the couple married on 19 May 2018.

References

External links 
 

Sports organisations of the United Kingdom
Social welfare charities based in the United Kingdom
Sports organizations established in 2007